P. S. Mithran is an Indian film director and writer, who is currently working in the Tamil film industry. Mithran is a staunch follower of Periyar. He made his directorial debut through Irumbu Thirai (2018). He followed it up with the superhero film, Hero (2019), and spy thriller, Sardar (2022).

Personal life 
Mithran Gets Married To Film Journalist Ashameera Aiyappan (View Pic)

Career
In August 2016, Vishal decided to fund and act in a venture directed by P. S. Mithran, and subsequently signed on actress Samantha to play the leading female role in the film. The team signed Arjun to play the antagonist in October 2016, with the actor accepting terms without hearing the film's entire script. Subsequently, music composer Yuvan Shankar Raja, cinematographer George C. Williams and editor Ruben were added to the project. Designers NJ Sathya and Neeraja Kona also were revealed to be in charge of the costumes of the lead actors for the film. The film, titled Irumbu Thirai, was released on 11 May 2018, to positive reviews from critics, for its story, screenplay, background score and performances (particularly those of Vishal and Arjun). It completed a 100-day box office run..

Mithran's next venture was the superhero film [[Hero (9), starring Sivakarthikeyan and Kalyani Priyadarshan in the lead roles. Mithran once again collaborated with actor Arjun and music director Yuvan Shankar Raja for the film, and debuted Bollywood actor Abhay Deol through the film, playing the main antagonist. The film released on 20 December 2019 to a positive reception from critics.

Mithran is currently working on his next project, Sardar, starring Karthi in the lead role.

Filmmaking
Mithran's films mainly focus on thrillers and common societal themes. His films often use green tinting. As of Hero, music director Yuvan Shankar Raja, cinematographer George C. Williams, and editor Ruben are his regular collaborators. His films have focused on topics such as cybersecurity, intellectual theft, national security, espionage, and water adulteration.

Through Hero (2019) and Sardar'' (2022), Mithran has introduced Bollywood actors, Abhay Deol and Chunky Pandey, into Tamil cinema.

Filmography

Film

References

Year of birth missing (living people)
Living people
Indian film directors
Tamil film directors
Film directors from Tamil Nadu
Screenwriters from Tamil Nadu